Udesh Chandra Shrestha known as Udesh Shrestha ( Nepali  : उदेश श्रेष्ठ; born 30 March 1981) is a Nepali pop singer, music composer, songwriter, music arranger & background scorer. Born in Dhulikhel, Kavrepalanchok Nepal, he was the fifth child of Ram Pyari Shrestha and Ram Shrestha.

Musical career 
Udesh Shrestha started his musical career in 1999 by recording his first single track Ghorahi Bazar. However, he was not noticed in the music industry until 2005 when he released his debut album titled Lovearea. In 2005, he was nominated in Hits Fm Music Award 2061 for Best Vocal Collaboration Song "Yo Junima" together with Bhugol Dahal for the album Lovearea. He has been nominated for various awards in Hits FM Music Award, Tuborg Image Awards, Music Khabar Music Award, Kalika FM Music Award, etc. He won the 14th Annual Tuborg Image Award for "Best Vocal Performance (Pop)" for the song Aansu Ko Thopa and 17th Annual Tuborg Image Award for "Best Song With National Feelings" for the song Uthau Uthau. He has been nominated in Tuborg Image Awards in six occasions and won a couple of times.

He worked on his skill with classical maestros like Professor Sangita Pradhan (Rana) and Dr. Hom Nath Upadhyaya. Currently, he's working on his 5th studio album due this fall. He is also active in some social work. He's been working for Yes Humanity ( A Non-Profit Organization in Sydney ) as the Nepal Ambassador since 2015. He's the celebrity spokesperson for the music streaming mobile app Yonder Music Nepal, powered by Ncell.

Early life 
From his early childhood, Udesh Shrestha was passionate about music. He went to Shree Triveni Higher Secondary School. He also attended Lalitkala Music College.

Album discography 
Love Area-2005
Rahasya-2007
Still Alive-2012
Variation-2016

Songs 

Yo Junima
Kina Mayama
Bhakkano Phutera
Haina Bhaneko Chaina
Sindhuli Gadhi
K Bhayo Kina Bhayo
Godhuli Saanjh
Naatak
Timrai Lagi
Yo Aansu
Thikai Cha
Swartha
My Love is True
Yo Din Yo Raat
Nasocha
Sakdina
Huncha Maya Ma
Tara Tipera
Pahad Royeko Chha
Jogaum Mili
Desh Nr\irman
Nasalu Nayaan
Yo Dashain

International tours 
Hong Kong-2005
Dubai-2007
Thailand-2012
Australia-2015

References 

1981 births
Living people
21st-century Nepalese male singers
Newar
People from Kavrepalanchok District